Parastygarctus is a genus of tardigrades, in the family Stygarctidae. It was first described and named by Jeanne Renaud-Debyser in 1965.

Species
The genus includes seven species:
 Parastygarctus biungulatus Morone De Lucia, Grimaldi de Zio & D'Addabbo Gallo, 1984
 Parastygarctus higginsi Renaud-Debyser, 1965 - founded within Madagascar
 Parastygarctus mediterranicus Gallo D’Addabbo, Grimaldi de Zio & Sandulli, 2001
 Parastygarctus renaudae Grimaldi de Zio, D’Addabbo Gallo, Morone De Lucia & Daddabbo, 1987
 Parastygarctus robustus Hansen, Kristensen & Jørgensen, 2012
 Parastygarctus sterreri Renaud-Mornant, 1970
 Parastygarctus svennevigi Hansen, Kristensen & Jørgensen, 2012

References

Publications
Renaud-Debyser, 1965 : Parastygarctus higginsi n. g., n. sp. Tardigrade marin interstitiel de Madagascar. [Parastygarctys higgins n. g. n. sp., Underwater Tardigrade from Madagascar] Report from the Academy of Sciences, Paris, vol. 260, p. 955-957.

Stygarctidae
Tardigrade genera